Charles M. Waterman was the 17th mayor of New Orleans (June 17, 1856 – June 3, 1858).

Waterman was nominated for mayor in 1856 as the Know Nothing Party candidate when he was about 47 years of age. 

The New Orleans City Council impeached and removed Waterman from office on 3 June 1858. Henry M. Summers was appointed interim mayor, serving from 5 to 21 June.

Waterman disappeared in June 1860, possibly committing suicide by jumping into the Mississippi River, where his hat was later found on a ferry on the river.

See also
 List of people who disappeared

References

External links
 Contemporary news article pertaining to Charles M. Waterman
 Administrations of the Mayors of New Orleans, Charles M. Waterman, Louisiana Division, New Orleans Public Library

1860s missing person cases
Mayors of New Orleans
Missing person cases in Mississippi
Year of birth missing
Year of death missing